is a role-playing video game that was released for the Super Famicom exclusively for the Japanese market. The game revolves around the main character being trapped in a theme park based around the works of Jules Verne such as A Journey to the Center of the Earth and Twenty Thousand Leagues Under the Sea.

Plot

The player controls a young man visiting a theme park (which is shaped like seven interconnected islands) with his little brother during the summer of 2028. The player soon finds out that he is trapped inside the park by himself. Enemies include an animatronic screw, SD Gundams, and a man that transforms into a drilling rig.

At the final level of the game, players must battle a nefarious version of Jules Verne himself in order to determine the fate of the theme park.

Gameplay
While players start out as incredibly incompetent in battle, they eventually start hitting the target monsters more frequently after leveling up. Players start out with an unusually high number of hit points but can easily die, although they have access to healing services. Healing is done by eating food items at a restaurant, as opposed to sleeping at an inn. Players use items like bamboo sticks and basketballs as weapons against the enemies, which are fought in a manner similar to the Romancing SaGa video game series.

Some of the allies included in the game are a young girl in a wheelchair and a young boy from India. Other allies include main characters from Jules Verne's novels, like Passepartout and Mr. Fogg from Around the World in Eighty Days, for example.

See also
Tenshi no Uta
Cosmic Fantasy
Psycho Dream

References

External links
 Verne World - Information 

1995 video games
Japan-exclusive video games
Super Nintendo Entertainment System games
Super Nintendo Entertainment System-only games
Video games based on works by Jules Verne
Video games set in the 2020s
Video games developed in Japan
Japanese role-playing games
Banpresto games
Single-player video games
Video games set in amusement parks
Works based on Twenty Thousand Leagues Under the Sea